Acronicta radcliffei, or Radcliffe's dagger moth, is a moth of the family Noctuidae. The species was first described by Leon F. Harvey in 1875. It is found in eastern and southern North America.

The wingspan is 36–38 mm. Adults are on wing from May to August depending on the location.

Recorded food plants include ash, birch, chokecherry, elm, serviceberry, sour cherry, wild black cherry and willow.

Subspecies
Acronicta radcliffei radcliffei
Acronicta radcliffei vancouverensis

Life cycle

External links

"Acronicta radcliffei (Harvey, 1875)". The Lepidoptera of Wayne County, Ohio. Retrieved November 14, 2020.

Acronicta
Moths of North America
Moths described in 1875
Taxa named by Leon F. Harvey